The Tri-State Area Tuition Mission Foundation, popularly known as Tuition Mission or TMF, is a scholarship foundation located in East Liverpool, Ohio.

Mission
The foundation makes tuition awards to needy area students who want to pursue post-secondary education. Scholarships are made solely based on financial need, and may be used for tuition at a trade school, college or graduate school.

History
Tuition Mission Foundation began as a Dollars for Scholars chapter. It was incorporated on November 28, 1962.

The chapter made its first tuition awards in 1963. These scholarships totaled $9,750 and were made to 20 needy college-bound students from the school districts of East Liverpool, Beaver Local, Chester-Newell (West Virginia) and Wellsville.

On May 7, 2013, the board of directors voted to disaffiliate from Dollars for Scholars and its parent organization, Scholarship America. This was in response to an early 2013 effort by Scholarship America to update standards and practices among all Dollars for Scholars chapters, which number about 1,000 nationwide. Specifically, Scholarship America had decided that it would no longer allow repayments by past recipients.

The Tri-State Area Citizens' Scholarship Foundation chapter of Dollars for Scholars had, from its inception, required that past recipients repay their tuition awards. About half of the monies granted each year come from repayments, so negating that source of funding was unsupported by the board. This fundamental philosophical difference became the impetus for the chapter to disaffiliate and take on the new name of Tuition Mission Foundation.

Funding and scholarships
Tuition awards are funded by donations from area residents and former area residents; local businesses and clubs; investment income; and repayments from recipients who have graduated or discontinued their education.

All tuition awards function essentially as interest-free loans. Applicants sign a pledge stating that upon graduating or discontinuing their education, they will repay their tuition award. Past recipients are expected to repay 1% of the total owed if it's $5,000 or less. They are expected to pay 0.5% of the total owed if it's greater than $5,000. Repayments are required on a monthly basis.

From 1992 to present, Tuition Mission has put 100% of its income towards scholarships. The only exception to this rule is when a donor asks that his or her contribution be invested. In those cases, the investment income is put towards scholarships. All overhead and administrative costs associated with the foundation are donated by a few generous local supporters.

Since 1963, the foundation has provided tuition awards to over 6,000 individual students, totaling over a little over $7 million. For the 2021 - 2022 academic year, awards totaling over $340,100 were made. The top award was $10,000 per student, with about half of recipients receiving this amount. It was the first time since the foundation was launched that the top award amount broke into the five-figure category.

Service area
Students who reside within seven specific school districts in the tri-state area are eligible to apply. In eastern Ohio, these districts are Beaver Local, East Liverpool and Wellsville. In northern West Virginia, Tuition Mission serves the Oak Glen district (also known as the Hancock County district). In western Pennsylvania, districts served include Midland, South Side and Western Beaver.

Tuition Mission also serves students who attend a number of tri-state area non-traditional schools such as Lincoln Park Performing Arts Charter School and the Pennsylvania Cyber Charter School, both in Midland, Pennsylvania, Quaker Digital Academy (headquartered in New Philadelphia, Ohio) and Buckeye Online School for Success and East Liverpool Christian School, both in East Liverpool. If enrolled in any of these non-traditional schools, applicants must reside in any of the seven school districts served by the foundation.

External links
Tuition Mission Foundation official website
GuideStar by Candid guide to non-profit organizations

Scholarships in the United States